Marquis Zhuang may refer to:

Marquis Zhuang of Cai (died 612 BC)
Marquess Gong of Han (died 363 BC), also known as Marquis Zhuang

Han dynasty and Three Kingdoms period
Pang De (died 219), general under the warlord Cao Cao
Wen Ping (died after 226), Cao Wei general
Xu Huang (died 227), Cao Wei general
Cao Xiu (died 228), Cao Wei general
Xu Chu (died  230), Cao Wei general
Zhang He (died 231), Cao Wei general
Zhou Tai (Cao Wei) (died 261), Cao Wei general